Jay Walker may refer to:

 Jay Walker (legislator) (born 1972), American politician and former American football quarterback 
 Jay S. Walker (born 1956), American entrepreneur
 Jay Walker, a character from Ninjago (TV series)

See also 
 Jaywalker (disambiguation)
 Jason Walker (disambiguation)